"Fångad av en stormvind" ("Captured by a Storm Wind") is a song by Swedish singer-songwriter Carola Häggkvist. It was written and produced by Stephan Berg. The song is the best known as 's winning entry at the Eurovision Song Contest 1991 held in Rome, Italy, with 146 points.

"Fångad av en stormvind" peaked at number three on the Swedish Singles Chart and number six on the Norwegian Singles Chart, while its English-language version "Captured by a Lovestorm" charted in Austria, Belgium (Flanders) and The Netherlands.

Critical reception 
Robbert Tilli from Music & Media wrote, "Very reminiscent of one-time winner Bucks Fizz, the song is a typical example of a happy and cheerful first-prize tune."

Eurovision Song Contest 
Carola earned the right to represent Sweden in the Eurovision Song Contest 1991 after convincingly winning Melodifestivalen 1991. Her entry received 78 points, 32 points more than the runner-up song "Ett liv med dej" by Towe Jaarnek.

At the Eurovision Song Contest 1991, which was held in Rome, Italy, Carola performed eighth, following 's Sarah Bray with "Un baiser volé", and preceding 's Amina with "C'est le dernier qui a parlé qui a raison". At the end of the voting procedure, Sweden and France had 146 points each, and had received the same number of twelve-point sets. However, Sweden was given the victory as it had received more ten-point votes than France, as that was the procedure at the time. That rule had been introduced in order to avoid a split victory, as it had happened at the Eurovision Song Contest 1969. The 1991 contest was the first and the last time that procedure was used.

It was also the second time Carola represented Sweden in Eurovision: she had taken part in the 1983 contest with the song "Främling", which had finished third. She once again represented  in the Eurovision Song Contest 2006 with the song "Invincible", placing fifth.

Other versions 
In addition to the original Swedish-language version, Carola also recorded an English-language version of the song, "Captured by a Lovestorm", with the lyrics written by Richard Hampton. The remix of both versions, called "Hurricane Remix", was done by Emil Hellman.

Track listing 

7-inch single (Swedish edition)
 "Fångad av en stormvind" – 3:00
 "Captured by a Lovestorm" – 3:00

Maxi single (Swedish edition)
 "Captured by a Lovestorm" – 3:00
 "Fångad av en stormvind" – 3:00
 "Captured by a Lovestorm (12-inch Hurricane Remix)" – 5:37
 "Captured by a Lovestorm (7-inch Hurricane Remix)" – 3:03

"Captured by a Lovestorm" 12-inch single (Swedish edition)
A1. "Captured by a Lovestorm (12-inch Hurricane Remix)" – 5:37
B1. "Captured by a Lovestorm" – 3:00
B2. "Captured by a Lovestorm (7-inch Hurricane Remix)" – 3:03

"Captured by a Lovestorm" 7-inch single (European edition)
A1. "Captured by a Lovestorm" – 3:00
A2. "Fångad av en stormvind" – 3:00

"Captured by a Lovestorm" (European edition)
 "Captured by a Lovestorm" – 3:00
 "Fångad av en stormvind" – 3:00
 "Captured by a Lovestorm" – 3:00
 "Captured by a Lovestorm (7-inch Hurricane Remix)" – 3:03

Charts

Certifications

Cover versions 
The Swedish heavy metal band Black Ingvars covered "Fångad av en stormvind" on their 1998 album Schlager Metal.

In 2000, demoscene artist "Auricom" covered "Fångad av en stormvind" and named it "Fångad av en korvring". This version of the song was later used in the site OMFGDOGS.

In 2005, Chilean urban singer DJ Méndez performed the song at the Alla tiders Melodifestival, a festival to celebrate the 50 years of Melodifestivalen. The song reached 9th place among 10 competitors.

See also 
 List of Eurovision Song Contest winners

References

External links 
 "Fångad av en stormvind" performance at the Eurovision Song Contest 1991
 "Fångad av en stormvind" on Discogs

1991 singles
1991 songs
Carola Häggkvist songs
Eurovision songs of 1991
Eurovision songs of Sweden
Eurovision Song Contest winning songs
Melodifestivalen songs of 1991
Ariola Records singles
RCA Records singles
Songs written by Stephan Berg
Swedish-language songs